Quando la coppia scoppia is a 1981 Italian comedy film directed by Steno.  It reproposes the couple formed by  Enrico Montesano and Claude Brasseur, who had successfully starred in the two years older comedy film Aragosta a colazione.

Cast 
 Enrico Montesano: Enrico Granata
 Claude Brasseur: Piergiorgio Funari
 Dalila Di Lazzaro: Angela
 Lia Tanzi: Rossana 
 Daniela Poggi: Mara
 Marta Zoffoli: Anna
 Franco Caracciolo: Pedrozzi
 Gigi Reder: Piergiorgio Martini
 Ugo Bologna: Father of Enrico
 Giorgio Bracardi: Armani

References

External links

1981 films
Italian comedy films
1981 comedy films
Films directed by Stefano Vanzina
Films scored by Piero Umiliani
Adultery in films
1980s Italian-language films
1980s Italian films